Pterostylis pyramidalis, commonly known as the tall snail orchid or leafy snail orchid is a species of orchid which is endemic to the south-west of Western Australia.

Description
Pterostylis pyramidalis has 3 or 4 leaves bunched near the base and 6 or 7 scattered up the flower stalk, with those near the base having a petiole (stalk) and those further up sessile (stalkless). The flowers appear from August to October and are green and white, . Flowering is stimulated by summer fires.

Taxonomy and naming
Pterostylis pyramidalis was first formally described by John Lindley in A Sketch of the Vegetation of the Swan River Colony in 1840. The genus Pterostylis has been reviewed by David Jones and Mark Clements who changed the name from P. pyramidalis to Linguella pyramidalis but the new name has not been widely accepted, including by the Western Australian Herbarium. The specific epithet (pyramidalis) is a Latin word meaning "pyramid-shaped".

Distribution and habitat
The tall snail orchid grows on grey-black peaty sand on the margins of swamps. It sometimes forms large colonies often with the flowers partly submerged. It occurs in the Avon Wheatbelt, Esperance Plains, Jarrah Forest, Mallee, Swan Coastal Plain and Warren biogeographic regions of Western Australia.

Conservation status
This species is classified as "not threatened" by the Government of Western Australia Department of Parks and Wildlife.

References

pyramidalis
Endemic orchids of Australia
Orchids of Western Australia
Plants described in 1840
Endemic flora of Western Australia